The list of shipwrecks in 2017 includes ships sunk, foundered, grounded, or otherwise lost during 2017.

January

1 January

2 January

7 January

8 January

10 January

11 January

13 January

14 January

17 January

20 January

26 January

27 January

28 January

31 January

February

3 February

7 February

11 February

13 February

16 February

17 February

21 February

23 February

24 February

25 February

March

1 March

3 March

4 March

5 March

9 March

14 March

13–16 March

16 March

19 March

21 March

24 March

28 March

31 March

April

6 April

7 April

8 April

9 April

10 April

12 April

17 April

18 April

19 April

20 April

21 April

23 April

27 April

May

1 May

6 May

7 May

8 May

10 May

14 May

15 May

19 May

24 May

29 May

30 May

June

3 June

5 June

6 June

8 June

10 June

12 June

14 June

15 June

16 June

17 June

18 June

20 June

21 June

24 June

25 June

26 June

27 June

28 June

29 June

July

2 July

3 July

9 July

12 July

14 July

15 July

17 July

20 July

21 July

23 July

26 July

29 July

31 July

Unknown date

August

1 August

2 August

5 August

6 August

11 August

14 August

15 August

18 August

19 August

20 August

21 August

22 August

23 August

25 August

26 August

27 August

29 August

30 August

September

1 September

2 September

5 September

6 September

9 September

10 September

11 September

12 September

13 September

17 September

20 September

23 September

25 September

26 September

29 September

30 September

October

5 October

6 October

8 October

10 October

13 October

14 October

15 October

16 October

18 October

23 October

28 October

29 October

30 October

31 October

November

1 November

4 November

5 November

11 November

15 November

18 November

21 November

27 November

28 November

29 November

Unknown date

December

1 December

2 December

4 December

7 December

8 December

10 December

17 December

19 December

20 December

21 December

22 December

Unknown date

Unknown date

References

Shipwrecks
2017